The Savannah Machine & Foundry Company was an American shipbuilder, in Savannah, Georgia, founded in 1912.  It was founded by Walter Lee Mingledorf.  It was sold in 1968 to Aegis Corporation.

It built a series of Auk-class and Admirable-class minesweepers for the U.S. Navy as well as salvage ships.

References

Manufacturing plants in the United States
Shipbuilding companies of the United States
Shipyards of the United States
Industrial buildings and structures in Georgia (U.S. state)